List of Australian films of 1992 contains a detailed list of films created in Australia in 1992.

1992

See also 
 1993 in Australia
 1993 in Australian television

References

External links 
 Australian film at the Internet Movie Database

1992
Lists of 1992 films by country or language
Films